Mohit Ratnakar Takalkar (Marathi: मोहित टाकळकर) (born 18 August 1977) is an Indian theatre director, filmmaker and film editor from Pune, Maharashtra.  He has led and spawned a movement in Marathi experimental theatre through his 25-year-long career by co-founding the theatre company, Aasakta Kalamanch in 2003.

Takalkar has directed more than 30 experimental plays in Marathi, Hindi, Urdu, Kannada, Marwari and English languages. He has directed movies including The Bright Day and Medium Spicy. He also runs his restaurant Barometer in Pune.

Personal life
In 2000, he met Geetanjali Joshi, an actor during rehearsals of his first playYayati. They married in 2005 but separated in 2007. 

In 2011, he was diagnosed with Bipolar II disorder and has been quite vocal about it.

Career 

He completed graduation from the Institute of Hotel Management, Mumbai and briefly worked in the hospitality industry as a chef, before shifting his focus towards the entertainment industry. He then studied animation from the Centre for Development of Advanced Computing.

Theatre 

Takalkar started his theatre career with the Progressive Dramatic Association, Pune. He won the Maharashtra State Award for the Best Play and Best Director for Yayati and Nanephek and later for Tu (2007).

In 2003, he co-founded Aasakta Kalamanch to extensively work in cutting-edge theatre, experimenting with language, form, content and presentation. His plays are known for minimalism in staging with a high level of technical excellence and a strong visual language. Takalkar directed a flurry of plays for Aasakta repertory, which were mainly performed in Sudarshan Rangmanch, a small intimate theatre space for about 100 odd audiences, in the heart of Pune. Takalkar often acknowledges the contribution of this space in experiments with his craft.

He received the Charles Wallace scholarship which enabled him to pursue his Masters degree in Theatre Practice from the University of Exeter in 2010 under the guidance of Phillip Zarrilli. This exposure changed his practice and upon returning to India he directed plays with large ensemble casts which include Comrade Kumbhakarna, written by Ramu Ramanathan, for the repertory company of the National School of Drama. Deepa Ganesh for the Hindu wrote, “The play, intense and multi-layered, is full of signs and metaphors, weaving into its polyphonic narrative, mythology, politics and life as it were”.

He then went on to direct his Marathi production of Uney Purey Shahar Ek based on the English play, Bendakaalu on Toast by Girish Karnad. Shanta Gokhale for Pune Mirror wrote, “Mohit Takalkar walks with Karnad step for step, giving us a piece of theatre that is memorable as much for its strong conviction as for its refined stage craft”.

In 2015, he directed the Hindostani production of Main Hoon Yusuf aur ye hai Mera Bhai translated from Palestinian playwright, Amir Nizar Zuabi's English play, I am Yusuf and this is my brother. It went on to win five awards at the Mahindra Excellence in Theatre Awards, including Best Play and Best Director. Critic Shanta Gokhale reviewing for Mumbai Mirror wrote, “Followers of this director’s work are accustomed to seeing a stage design that intrigues the eye. In this case, there was just a table at the beginning and a low white ‘rock’ later,  that also served as diverse seating arrangements. As the stories of the characters unfolded, the starkness of the stage became part of the meaning of the play, reflecting the fear, confusion and misery that was invading their lives”. In 2017, Takalkar directed Chaheta  in Urdu,  based on another of Zuabi's plays, The Beloved. 

Takalkar directed two plays for Aadyam, an initiative of the Aditya Birla Group. Gajab Kahani an adaptation of Jose Saramago’s The Elephant’s journey, was played in a black box, where the audience sat in the center on swivel chairs while the play was performed in 360 degrees around them. He then went on to  direct Mosambi Narangi, an Hindi adaptation of Marie Jones' English play, Stones in His Pockets, in which two actors, Rajit Kapur and Ajeet Singh Palawat, played more than 20 characters.

During the COVID-19 pandemic in 2020, Takalkar directed a digital play, The Colour of Loss based on Booker Prize winner, Han Kang’s The White Book. When the theatres re-opened after the pandemic, he devised a multilingual theatre piece, Hunkaro which is based on the story Asha Amar Dhan by Vijaydan Detha. Deepa Punjani for Mumbai Theatre Guide wrote, “Mohit's directorial sensibilities put the story and the actor first, but the design though not obvious, is palpable. The simplicity belies the more abstract”.

Films 
 The Bright Day (2012)
 Chirebandi (2017)
 Medium Spicy (2022)

In 2012, Takalkar scripted, edited, and directed his debut feature film The Bright Day in Hindi-English which premiered at the Toronto International Film Festival. It was in competition at the Shanghai International Film Festival, Mumbai International Film Festival, and was showcased at the London Indian Film Festival, Vancouver South Asian Film Festival, Calgary International Film Festival, Indian Film Festival -The Hague. It won the Grand Jury Prize and Best Director at the South Asian International Film Festival. The film stars Sarang Sathaye, Radhika Apte, Rajit Kapur, Shernaz Patel and Mohan Agashe. Katherine Matthews for Bollyspice wrote, “The Bright Day occasionally feels staged, the dialogues occasionally stilted, but there is much in Takalkar’s film that is thoughtful, joyous and charming”.

In 2017, he scripted, edited, and directed his debut non-feature in Marathi-English, Chirebandi on the life and works of celebrated Playwright Mahesh Elkunchwar, which was commissioned by the Sahitya Akademi, New Delhi.

In 2019 he went on to direct his debut Marathi feature film, Medium Spicy for Landmarc Films starring Sai Tamhankar, Parna Pethe and Lalit Prabhakar. The film released three years later in June 2022 because of the COVID-19 pandemic. Meenakshi Shedde for Mid-Day wrote, “Takalkar’s film is a nuanced reflection on the unreliable rewards of love and marriage. It is an astute, funny, thoughtful and philosophical film about people like us, with enough romance and romantic songs to make it a rather satisfying indie film that is streets ahead of Bollywood in many ways”.
The film was screened at Norway Bollywood Film Festival, Pune International Film Festival, Dhaka International Film Festival, River to River Florence Indian Film Festival and the Stuttgart Indian Film Festival.

In July 2022, it was announced that Takalkar would direct his next Marathi film Toh, Ti ani Fuji (Him, Her and Fuji). The film will be shot in Pune and Tokyo and stars Lalit Prabhakar and Mrinmayee Godbole.

Takalkar has edited over 20 feature films which include, Cobalt Blue, Soyarik, Kaasav, Astu, Badha, Dithee, Chidiya, Nital, Samhita among others.

He has played minor roles in films like, Godavari, Gho Mala Asla Hava, CRD, Devrai. However, Takalkar maintains that he acts only for fun and that he lacks the conviction and hard work necessary for being an actor.

Accolades 

 Homi Bhabha Fellow 2016–2018
 Shankar Nag Theatre Award for the year 2015
 Best Director at the Mahindra Excellence in Theatre Awards for Mein Huun Yusuf Aur Yeh Hai Mera Bhai (2016)
 Ustad Bismillah Khan Yuva Puraskar
 Grand jury prize for Best Director and Best Film for The Bright Day at the New York South Asian Film Festival
 Charles Wallace Scholar 2009-2010

References

External links
 

1977 births
Living people
Indian theatre directors
Marathi film directors
Marathi screenwriters
Marathi film editors